Kristen Paton (born 21 December 1996) is a South African field hockey player for the South African national team.

Career

Under–18
Paton made hem debut for the South Africa U–18 in 2014 at the Youth Olympic Games in Nanjing.

Under–21
Paton made her debut for the South Africa U–21 in 2016 at the Junior Africa cup for Nations in Windhoek.

National team
She participated at the 2018 Women's Hockey World Cup.

References

External links

1996 births
Living people
South African female field hockey players
Female field hockey midfielders
Field hockey players at the 2018 Commonwealth Games
Commonwealth Games competitors for South Africa
Field hockey players at the 2020 Summer Olympics
Olympic field hockey players of South Africa
Field hockey players at the 2014 Summer Youth Olympics
20th-century South African women
21st-century South African women
Field hockey players at the 2022 Commonwealth Games